Sertaç Şanlı (born 5 August 1991) is a Turkish professional basketball player for FC Barcelona of the Spanish Liga ACB and the EuroLeague. He plays at the center position.

Professional career
He made his professional debut in the TB2L with Genç Telekom during the 2008-09 season. In the summer of 2010, he signed a contract with Galatasaray. On 18 October 2011, Sertaç transferred to Tofaş Bursa on a one-year loan deal till end of the 2011-12 season. He played 5 league games for Tofaş Bursa.

He signed with Anadolu Efes in 2018. He averaged 7.8 points and 4.7 rebounds per game in the 2019-20 season. On July 14, 2020, he re-signed with the team.

On July 1, 2021, he has signed with FC Barcelona of the Spanish Liga ACB.

National team career
Şanlı represented the Turkish national team at the EuroBasket 2017, and the 2019 FIBA World Cup.

Awards and accomplishments
Barcelona
 Copa del Rey de Baloncesto: (2022)
Anadolu Efes
 EuroLeague: (2021)
 2× Turkish Super League: (2019, 2021)
 2× Turkish Presidential Cup: (2018, 2019)

References

External links
TBLStat.net Profile

1991 births
Living people
2019 FIBA Basketball World Cup players
Anadolu Efes S.K. players
Beşiktaş men's basketball players
Centers (basketball)
FC Barcelona Bàsquet players
Galatasaray S.K. (men's basketball) players
Gaziantep Basketbol players
Liga ACB players
Basketball players from Istanbul
Tofaş S.K. players
Trabzonspor B.K. players
Turkish men's basketball players
Uşak Sportif players